Influencer marketing (also known as influence marketing) is a form of social media marketing involving endorsements and product placement from influencers, people and organizations who have a purported expert level of knowledge or social influence in their field.  Influencers are someone (or something) with the power to affect the buying habits or quantifiable actions of others by uploading some form of original—often sponsored—content to social media platforms like Instagram, YouTube, Snapchat or other online channels.  Influencer marketing is when a brand enrolls influencers who have an established credibility and audience on social media platforms to discuss or mention the brand in a social media post. Influencer content may be framed as testimonial advertising.

Social influence 
Most discussions of social influence focus on social persuasion and compliance. In the context of influencer marketing, influence is less about arguing for a point of view or product than about loose interactions between parties in a community (often with the aim of encouraging purchasing or behavior). Although influence is often equated with advocacy, it may also be negative. The two-step flow of communication model was introduced in The People's Choice (Paul Lazarsfeld, Bernard Berelson, and Hazel Gaudet's 1940 study of voters' decision-making processes), and developed in Personal Influence (Lazarsfeld, Elihu Katz 1955) and The Effects of Mass Communication (Joseph Klapper, 1960).

Influencer marketing is also important through social comparison theory. As psychologist Chae reports, influencers serve as a comparison tool. Consumers may compare influencer lifestyles with their imperfections. Meanwhile, followers may view influencers as people with perfect lifestyles, interests, and dressing style. As such, the promoted products may serve as a shortcut towards a complete lifestyle. Chae's study finds women with low self-esteem compare themselves to the influencers. As such, they elevate the status of influencers above themselves. When using an influencer, a brand may use consumer insecurities to its benefits. For this reason, influencer marketing may lead to faulty advertising.

Influencers 

There is a lack of consensus about what an influencer is. One writer defines them as "a range of third parties who exercise influence over the organization and its potential customers." Another defines an influencer as a "third party who significantly shapes the customer's purchasing decision but may never be accountable for it." According to another, influencers are "well-connected, create an impact, have active minds, and are trendsetters". And just because an individual has many followers does not necessarily mean they have much influence over those individuals, only that they have many followers.

Identifying influencers 
Market-research techniques can be used to identify influencers, using predefined criteria to determine the extent and type of influence. "Activists" get involved with organizations such as their communities, political movements, and charities. "Connected influencers" have large social networks. "Authoritative influencers" are trusted by others. "Active minds" have a diverse range of interests. "Trendsetters" are the early adopters (or leavers) of markets. According to Malcolm Gladwell, "The success of any kind of social epidemic is heavily dependent on the involvement of people with a particular and rare set of social gifts". He has identified three types of influencers who are responsible for the "generation, communication and adoption" of messages:
 Connectors network with a variety of people, have a wide reach, and are essential to word-of-mouth communication.
 Mavens use information, share it with others, and are insightful about trends.
 Salesmen are "charismatic persuaders". Their influence is the tendency of others to imitate their behavior.

Influencer categories 

Influencers are categorized by the number of followers they have on social media. They include celebrity endorsements from those with large followings, to niche content creators with a loyal following on social-media platforms such as YouTube, Instagram, Facebook, and Twitter. Their followers range in number from hundreds of millions to 1,000. 

 Nano-influencers - These are influencers that have a following ranging from 1k to 10k.
 Micro-influencers - These are the influencers with followers in the range of 10K to 100k 
 Macro-influencers - These are the influencers with followers from the range of 100K to 500k
 Mega/Celeb-influencers - These are the influencers with more than 500k followers  

Businesses pursue people who aim to lessen their consumption of advertisements, and are willing to pay their influencers more. Targeting influencers is seen as increasing marketing's reach, counteracting a growing tendency by prospective customers to ignore marketing.

Marketing researchers Kapitan and Silvera find that influencer selection extends into product personality. This product and benefit matching is key. For a shampoo, it should use an influencer with good hair. Likewise, a flashy product may use bold colors to convey its brand. If an influencer is not flashy, they will clash with the brand. Matching an influencer with the product's purpose and mood is important.

B2B influencers 
For most business-to-consumer (B2C) campaigns, influencers may include everyday consumers who have influence over their audience. In high-value business-to-business (B2B) transactions, influencers may be diverse and might include consultants, government-backed regulators, financiers, and user communities.

Forrester Research analyst Michael Speyer notes that for small and medium-sized businesses, "IT sales are influenced by several parties, including peers, consultants, bloggers, and technology resellers." According to Speyer, "Vendors need to identify and characterize influencers inside their market. This requires a comprehensive influencer identification program and the establishment of criteria for ranking influencer impact on the decision process." Influencers can play a variety of roles at different times in a decision-making process, an idea developed by Brown and Hayes.

Payment 
Most influencers are paid before the start of a marketing campaign, and others are paid after it ends. Consensus exists about how much an influencer should be paid. Compensation may vary by how many people an influencer can reach, the extent to which they will endorse the product (a deliverable), and the success of their past endorsements have performed. Top-tier influencers and celebrities may receive a six- or seven-figure fee for a single social-media post. In addition to (or in lieu of) a fee, payment may include free products or services. For influencers with smaller followings, free products or services may be the only form of compensation.

Social media 
Online activity can play a central role in offline decision-making, allowing consumers to research products. Social media have created new opportunities for marketers to expand their strategy beyond traditional mass-media channels. Many use influencers to increase the reach of their marketing messages. Online influencers who curate personal brands have become marketing assets because of their relationship with their followers. Social-media influencers establish themselves as opinion-leaders with their followers and may have persuasive strengths such as attractiveness, likeability, niche expertise, and perceived good taste. The interactive and personal nature of social media allows parasocial relationships to form between influencers and their followers, which impacts purchase behavior. Influencer marketing on social media reaches consumers who use ad-blockers.

Critics of an online-intensive approach say that by researching exclusively online, consumers can overlook input from other influential individuals. Early-2000s research suggested that 80 to 92 percent of influential consumer exchanges occurred face-to-face with word-of-mouth (WOM), compared to seven to 10 percent in an online environment. Scholars and marketers distinguish WOM from electronic word-of-mouth (eWOM).

2017 controversies 
YouTuber PewDiePie's antisemitic and racist comments led to cancelled deals with the Walt Disney Company and a "widespread backlash". Celebrity influencer Kendall Jenner and other media personalities failed to disclose their paid endorsements of the fraudulent Fyre Festival, as required by the Federal Trade Commission. YouTuber Logan Paul posted a video containing a dead body in Japan's Suicide Forest, sparking a backlash and accusations of insensitivity.

Use by governments
A wide range of global population, particularly generation Z, has been relying on social media influencers for all sorts of information. With millions of followers on their accounts, including Instagram, Snapchat, Facebook and others, influencers have not just been working with brands, but also governments. Countries like Egypt and the United Arab Emirates have been using these influencers to spread a positive image of them and cover the bad press over human rights. In Dubai, many such influencers have been working to promote the city’s tourism by acquiring an expensive license or through agencies. It has become a full-time business in Dubai’s post-oil economy. The Emirati authorities follow rigid plans and strategies to hit the correct spots. A strict check is maintained over the content of the influencers to make sure that everything is being depicted in a positive light. Dubai authorities also restrict these influencers from speaking anything against the regime, religion, or politics. A report in October 2022 revealed that the influencers, who promote a glistening Dubai on their social media, sell sex to pay their lifestyle. These influencers are paid thousands of pounds a night. The amount also depends on the number of followers, where more followers means more money. Apart from cash, these influencers are paid with jewellery, flights, bags, etc. While prostitution is illegal in Dubai, it has always been there. Increase in influencers selling sex was believed to be due to the rise in number of ultra-rich expatriates in the Dubai, including the Russian oligarchs moving to the emirate to escape the US sanctions.

Applications
Marketers use influencer marketing to establish credibility in a market, to create social conversations about brands, and to focus on driving online or in-store sales. Marketers leverage credibility gained over time to promote a variety of products or services. Success in influencer marketing is measured through earned media value, impressions, and cost per action.

A social media influencer's personal brand and product relation with marketers are important concepts. As social learning theory suggests, influencers serve as informed consumers, and authenticity matters. When credible influencers match up with the product, consumers will consider the promoted recommendations. A study found that respondents see influencers as a neutral authority pitch for a product. Compared to CEO spokespeople, influencers are more approachable and trustworthy. Consumers are more likely to respond to influencers if both parties share certain characteristics and beliefs.

A 2015 article depicts that attributions drive endorsers and that globally 77% of shoppers would or may take action following what family, friends, and online reviews endorse. It shows that word of mouth marketing and digital media have changed the impact and reach of endorsements.

Regulation 
In the United States, the Federal Trade Commission (FTC) treats influencer marketing as a form of paid endorsement. It is governed by the rules for native advertising, which include compliance with established truth-in-advertising standards and disclosure by endorsers (influencers) and is known as the Endorsement Guides. The FTC compiled an easy-to-read guide on disclosure for influencers, specifying rules and tips on how to make good disclosures on social media. The guidelines include reminders of disclosing sponsored products in easily visible places so it is hard to miss, using easy-to-understand language, and giving honest reviews about sponsored products.

In 2017, the FTC sent more than 90 educational letters to celebrity and athlete influencers with the reminder of the obligation to clearly disclose business relationships while sponsoring and promoting products. The same year, in response to YouTubers Trevor Martin and Thomas Cassell deceptively endorsing an online gambling site they owned, the FTC took three separate actions to catch the attention of influencers. By using law enforcement, warning letters, and updating the Endorsement Guidelines, the FTC provided influencers with endorsement questions or involved in misleading endorsements and disclosures with clear procedures of how to follow the laws.

Media-regulating bodies in other countries – such as Australia – followed the FTC in creating influencer-marketing guidelines. The United Kingdom's Competition and Markets Authority adopted similar laws and tips for influencers to follow.

Branded content on social media platforms

Facebook and Instagram 
Facebook and Instagram have a set of brand content policies for influencer marketing and endorsements. Branded content may only be posted through Instagram and Facebook, and require the business relationships between influencers and endorsers to be tagged when promoting branded content. The branded tool provided in the business layout of Facebook and Instagram is to be used whenever promoting products and endorsers.

YouTube 
As of August 2020, YouTube has updated the branded content policies. YouTube and Google's ad policies require influencers to check a box titled paid promotion when publishing sponsored videos and provides instructions on how to set it up. The policies require disclosure messages for the viewers to indicate that the content is promoted.

Fake influencers 
Fake influencers have been around for as long as their genuine counterparts, and all criteria used to determine the veracity of an influencer account can be fabricated. Third-party sites and apps sell services to individual accounts which include falsely increasing followers, likes, and comments. Instagram has failed to shut down all such websites. One marketing agency tested whether fake accounts could be profitable. The company created two fictitious accounts, built their online presence through paid followers and engagement (likes and comments), and applied for work in marketing campaigns on popular influencer-marketing platforms. They published their results, an explanation of how the false accounts were created, and which brands had sponsored them.

An analysis of over 7,000 influencers in the UK indicated that about half of their followers have up to 20,000 "low-quality" followers themselves, consisting of internet bots and other suspicious accounts. Over four in 10 engagements with this group of influencers are considered "non-authentic". A study of UK influencers which looked at almost 700,000 posts from the first half of 2018 found that 12 percent of UK influencers had bought fake followers. Twenty-four percent of influencers were found to have abnormal growth patterns in another study, indicating that they had manipulated their likes or followers.

Influencer fraud (including fake followers) was estimated to cost businesses up to $1.3 billion, about 15 percent of global influencermarketing spending. Research in 2019 accounted only for the calculable cost of fake followers.

Virtual influencers 
Virtual influencers are also sometimes considered fake. However, virtual-influencer profiles do not correspond to real individuals and are not automated bots which generate fake likes, comments, or followers. They are virtual characters, intentionally designed by 3D artists to look like real people in real situations. Although most of the characters can be easily identified as computer graphics, some are very realistic and can fool users. The characters are usually identified as models, singers, or other celebrities. Their creators write their biographies, conduct interviews on their behalf, and act like the characters themselves. Lil Miquela was a realistic virtual influencer which prompted curiosity and speculation until it was learned that she was created by advertisers.

A study published in 2022 indicate that over half of Chileans have never purchased products recommended by influencers.

See also

Alpha user
Business marketing
Celebrity branding
Customer engagement
Influence-for-hire
Mass communication
Opinion leadership
Relationship marketing
Reputation management
Shill
Social media in the fashion industry
Testimonial
Word-of-mouth marketing

References

External links
 

Social influence
Marketing by target group
Promotion and marketing communications